Anna I. Krylov (Russian: Анна Игоревна Крылова) is a Professor of Chemistry at the University of Southern California (USC), working in the field of theoretical and computational quantum chemistry. She is the inventor of the spin-flip method. Krylov is the president of Q-Chem, Inc. and an elected member of the International Academy of Quantum Molecular Science and the Academia Europaea.

Life and education 
Born in Donetsk, Ukraine (May 6, 1967), Krylov received her M.Sc. (with honors) in Chemistry from Moscow State University in 1990 and her Ph.D. (summa cum laude) from The Hebrew University of Jerusalem working under the supervision of Professor Robert Benny Gerber. Her Ph.D. research at the Fritz Haber Center focused on molecular dynamics in rare gas clusters and matrices.

Career 
Upon completing her Ph.D. in 1996, she joined the group of Prof. Martin Head-Gordon at the University of California, Berkeley, as a postdoctoral research associate, where she became involved with electronic structure method development. In 1998, she joined the Department of Chemistry at USC.

Research 
Professor Krylov leads the iOpenShell lab, a research group focused on theoretical modeling of open-shell and electronically excited species.  She develops robust black-box methods to describe complicated multi-configurational wave functions in single-reference formalisms, such as coupled-cluster and equation-of-motion (or linear response) approaches. She developed the spin-flip approach, which extends coupled-cluster and density functional methods to biradicals, triradicals, and bond-breaking. Krylov has also contributed to the development of molecular orbital concepts in the framework of many-body wave functions and to the extension of molecular orbital theory to the domain of non-linear optical properties and meta-stable electronic states. In addition, Krylov develops many-body theories for describing metastable electronic states (resonances) and tools for spectroscopy modeling, including non-linear optical properties and core-level transitions. Krylov is also known for her development of efficient algorithms and software for quantum chemistry computations. She is one of the developers of the open-source libtensor library for many-body calculations and the Q-Chem electronic structure package.

Using the tools of computational chemistry, and in collaboration with numerous experimental laboratories, Krylov also investigates the role that radicals and electronically excited species play in such diverse areas as combustion, gas- and condensed-phase chemistry, astrochemistry, solar energy, quantum information storage, bioimaging, and light-induced biological processes. She has co-authored more than 270 publications and has delivered more than 300 invited lectures, including the 2012 Löwdin Lecture at Uppsala University Sweden, the 2013 Coulson Lecture at the University of Georgia, and the 2018 Davison Lecture at the University of North Texas.

Science education and outreach 
Krylov has developed educational materials (computational labs and tutorials) aiming to increase quantum chemistry literacy among chemists. She has also developed films to help popularize science.  The two iOpenShell films, Shine a Light and Laser, have been viewed more than 66,000 times on YouTube since September 2009. In 2015, Krylov delivered a public lecture in the Telluride Science Research Center Town Talk series entitled “Molecules and Light: The Story of Life, Death, and our Quest for Knowledge”.

Awards 
Krylov has received worldwide recognition, in particular for her invention of the spin-flip method. She received the 2007 WATOC (World Association of Theoretical and Computational Chemists) Dirac Medal for her "outstanding research on new methods in electronic structure theory for the description of bond-breaking, in particular the spin-flip method", and the Agnes Fay Morgan Research Award, given by Iota Sigma Pi National Honor Society for outstanding research achievements to a woman chemist or biochemist under 40 years of age. She is the recipient of a Friedrich Wilhelm Bessel Research Award from the Alexander von Humboldt Foundation for developing robust electronic structure methods for open-shell and electronically excited species and creative use of ab initio theory to understand the chemistry of biomolecules, reaction intermediates, and photoinduced processes; and the recipient of the 2012 Theoretical Chemistry Award from the Physical Chemistry Division of the American Chemical Society.  In addition, she has received the USC Melon Mentoring Award, the Hanna Reisler Mentoring Award from the WiSE program, the USC Phi Kappa Phi Faculty Recognition Award, and the INSIGHT Into Diversity Inspiring Women in STEM Award.  In 2017, Krylov was recognized with the Mildred Dresselhaus Award from the Center for Ultrafast Imaging at DESY in Hamburg, Germany. In 2018, she was awarded a Simons Fellowship in Theoretical Physics from the Simons Foundation. In 2019 she received the American Physical Association's prestigious Earle K. Plyler Prize for Molecular Spectroscopy & Dynamics for her:"innovative work developing high accuracy electronic structure theory to inspire interpretation of spectroscopy of radicals, excited states, and ionization resonances in small molecules, biomolecules, and condensed phase solutes."In 2022, she received the USC Associates Award for Creativity in Research and Scholarship, the highest scholarly award granted by the University. That same year, she received the inaugural Communicator of the Year Award, Science and Mathematics, from the USC Dornsife College of Letters, Arts, and Sciences.  The award recognized her efforts to inform the scientific community and the general public through writings and speaking engagements of "the growing influence of politics and moral trends within STEM fields."

Krylov is a fellow of the American Physical Society, the American Chemical Society, the Royal Society of Chemistry, and the American Association for the Advancement of Science.

Professional merit 
Krylov has served on the editorial boards of numerous peer-review journals, including Annual Review of Physical Chemistry, the Journal of Chemical Physics, the Journal of Physical Chemistry, Chemical Physics Letters, the International Journal of Quantum Chemistry, Physical Chemistry–Chemical Physics, Molecular Physics, and Wires Computational Molecular Science. She has served as a guest editor of special issues of J. Phys. Chem. A honoring Prof. Benny Gerber and Prof. Hanna Reisler, the special issue of Chemical Reviews on Theoretical Modeling of Excited-State Processes, and the special issue of Physical Chemistry–Chemical Physics on Quantum Information Science.  Currently, she is an associate editor of Physical Chemistry-Chemical Physics (RSC) and of Wires Computational Molecular Science (Wiley).

Krylov has organized numerous symposia and is a board member of WATOC and the International Society for Theoretical Chemical Physics. She is the president of Q-Chem Inc. and a developer of Q-Chem, one of the world's leading ab initio quantum chemistry programs. In addition, she is an elected member of the International Academy of Quantum Molecular Science and an elected member (foreign) of the Academia Europaea.

In addition to her permanent appointment at USC, Krylov has served as a visiting professor at Caltech, University of Minnesota (Minneapolis), University of Colorado (JILA), Heidelberg University, University of Mainz, University of Groningen, the International Center for Theoretical Physics in Donostia, and the Center of Ultrafast Imaging at DESY in Hamburg.

Activism 
Krylov is active in the promotion of gender equality in STEM fields, especially in theoretical chemistry. She created and maintains the web directory Women in Theoretical and Computational Chemistry, Material Science, and Biochemistry, which currently lists more than 400 scientists holding tenure and tenure track academic positions, or equivalent positions in industry, national laboratories, and other leading research establishments. She has delivered several talks on gender equality in STEM including a lecture at the international symposium in Uppsala, Sweden.

Krylov is an outspoken advocate of freedom of speech and academic freedom.  She is a founding member of the Academic Freedom Alliance and a member of its academic leadership committee.  Her paper, "The Peril of Politicizing Science," which "launched a national conversation among scientists and the general public" on the growing influence of political ideology over STEM, has received over 90,000 views and, according to Altmetric, was the all-time highest-ranked article in the Journal of Physical Chemistry Letters.

Personal life 
Krylov lives in Southern California and enjoys outdoor sports, especially hiking and rock climbing.

References

External links 
 The Krylov iOpenShell Research Group Page
 Anna Krylov's academic genealogy

University of Southern California faculty
Members of the International Academy of Quantum Molecular Science
Living people
American women chemists
Computational chemists
Theoretical chemists
1967 births
American women academics
21st-century American women
Chemical physicists
Fellows of the American Physical Society